The humpback waspfish, (Cheroscorpaena tridactyla), is a species of wasp scorpionfish found only in the Gulf of Papua where it is an inhabitant of coral reefs.  This species grows to a length of  TL.  This species is the only known member of its genus.

References
 

Apistinae
Monotypic fish genera
Fish described in 1964
Endemic fauna of Papua New Guinea